The Benson & Hedges Cup was a one-day cricket competition for first-class counties in England and Wales that was held from 1972 to 2002, one of cricket's longest sponsorship deals.

It was the third major one-day competition established in England and Wales after the Sunday League and the Gillette Cup.  Traditionally a 'big day out' for the finalist's supporters, it was the less prestigious of the two cups. It began as a 55 over a side game, but was later reduced to 50.  The winning team in the first cup final in 1972, Leicestershire won £2,500, the losing finalists Yorkshire £1,000 and Chris Balderstone, winner of the man of the match – the coveted 'Gold Award' – £100.

Format

Twenty teams were organised into four zonal groups in its original format with the games played at the start of the season in May.  The (then) seventeen first-class counties were joined by three other teams, Minor Counties (North), Minor Counties (South) and Cambridge University who alternated with the University of Oxford. Each team played the others in the group, the winners of each game awarded three points plus, in its first year, a bonus point for bowling their opponents out.  The first two teams in each group went on to contest a quarter-final knock-out stage.  Groups were set up to create 'derby' games.

in 1975, the Oxford and Cambridge university sides combined to form an Oxford & Cambridge team which competed in every season thereafter. In 1976 the groupings were reorganised to remove the geographical element and the Minor Counties were divided into East and West instead of North and South. Scotland entered the competition in 1980 and the Minor Counties were reduced to one combined team.  Durham joined the competition in 1992, having become a first-class county; Ireland joined in 1994 and the competition was streamlined to a straight knock-out cup. Mike Atherton's Combined Universities side almost reached the semi-finals in 1989, running Somerset close in the quarter-final thanks to a century from another future England captain, Nasser Hussain. Ireland defeated Middlesex eight years later.

The final was played at Lord's, initially in mid-July, but latterly in late June. Viv Richards of Somerset made the highest score in a final, an unbeaten 132. Ken Higgs of Leicestershire took a hat-trick (Alan Butcher, Pat Pocock and Arnold Long) against Surrey in the final of 1974, but still ended on the losing side.  Other notable performances in its later days include Mark Alleyne's century for Gloucestershire in 1999, 112 from Aravinda de Silva as Kent lost in 1995, and Ben Hollioake's 115-ball 98 for Surrey in 1997. Last-ball or extremely close finishes in the final occurred in 1983 when Middlesex beat Essex, 1986 when Middlesex beat Kent, 1987 when Yorkshire beat Northamptonshire, 1989 when Nottinghamshire beat Essex, and in 1993 when Derbyshire beat Lancashire. In the 1989 final, Eddie Hemmings hit the last ball for a boundary to seal an unlikely victory.

The highest total ever recorded in the group matches was the 388 scored by Essex against Scotland in 1992. Graham Gooch scored 127 as Scotland lost by 272 runs. In another tie in 1982 Gooch also recorded the highest individual score in the competition, 198 not out.

At the Worcestershire v Somerset, 1979 B&H Cup group game at Worcester on 24 May 1979, the Somerset captain Brian Rose declared after one over with the score at 1 for 0. Worcestershire scored the required 2 runs in 10 balls. The declaration was done to protect Somerset's run-rate so they could qualify for the next round. After a special TCCB vote, Somerset were ejected from the competition for bringing the game into disrepute.

Abolishment

A ban on tobacco advertising deprived the cup of its sponsor and it was wound up in 2002 in favour of the Twenty20 Cup, first held the following year. The format of the Friends Provident Trophy echoed the Benson and Hedges Cup as teams competed in a group stage before going on to knockout rounds.

The umpires in the last final had faced each other as players in the first final 30 years before: John Hampshire for Yorkshire and Barry Dudleston for Leicestershire.

Finals

Wins summary
4 Lancashire
3 Gloucestershire, Kent, Leicestershire, Surrey
2 Essex, Hampshire, Middlesex, Somerset, Warwickshire
1 Derbyshire, Northamptonshire, Nottinghamshire, Worcestershire, Yorkshire.

Records
Highest Total – 388–7 Essex v Scotland at Chelmsford 1992
Highest Total Batting Second – 318–5 Lancashire v Leicestershire at Manchester 1995
Lowest Total – 50 Hampshire v Yorkshire at Leeds 1991
Highest Score – 198* Graham Gooch for Essex v Sussex at Hove 1982
Best Bowling – 7–12 Wayne Daniel for Middlesex v Minor Counties East at Ipswich 1978
Most Wicketkeeper dismissals in an innings – 8 (all caught) Derek Taylor for Somerset v Combined Universities at Taunton 1982

See also
Benson & Hedges
County Championship
Minor Counties

Notes and references

External links
 Can a captain in limited overs cricket declare his team's innings ? – Stump Bearders BBC Sport
 Scorecard for the 1972 final – Cricket Archive
 Gold award for Warwickshire's rising star – match report for the last final – Cricinfo – 2002

 
English domestic cricket competitions
Recurring sporting events established in 1972
Recurring sporting events disestablished in 2002
List A cricket competitions